Illegal taxicabs, sometimes known as pirate taxis, gypsy cabs, or jitney cabs, are taxicabs and other for-hire vehicles that are not duly licensed or permitted by the jurisdiction in which they operate. Most major cities worldwide require taxicabs to be licensed, safety-inspected, insured as for-hire vehicles and use taximeters and there may also be requirements that the taxi driver be registered or accredited. However, many unlicensed cabs are in operation. Illegal cabs may be marked taxi vehicles (sometimes referred to as "speedy cabs"), and others are personal vehicles used by an individual to offer unauthorized taxi-like services.  Illegal cabs are prevalent in cities with medallion systems, which restrict the number of legal cabs in operation. Since their introduction in 2009, vehicles affiliated with the transportation network company Uber have been classified as illegal taxicabs in some jurisdictions.

Terminology
A variety of terms are used in the industry to describe legal and illegal transportation providers.  Hacks or hackers is a common term that originated with the hackney horse, a breed of horse typically offered for hire in the 19th century.  Other terms used are livery cab, car service, or jitney cab.

The phrases vary by locality and often refer to different classes of licensed transportation providers.

In mainland China, illegal cabs are referred to as black taxis or black cars (黑车), or alternatively blue-plate cars (蓝牌车), referring to the colour of the licence plates for private vehicles, rather than yellow for public service vehicles.

In Lagos, Nigeria, illegal cabs are usually referred to as kabu kabu.

In Hong Kong, illegal cabs are usually referred to as white card, due to the different licence plate appearance between commercial and non-commercial vehicles.

In Malaysia, illegal taxicabs are called prebet sapu (sweep privates).

In the Philippines, illegal taxis operating as Public Utility Vehicles (PUVs) without proper franchise are called colorums.

In Madrid, Spain, illegal taxicabs meant for carrying drug addicts to the meeting point with drug dealers are called cundas (singular, cunda).

In Mexico, illegal taxicabs are called taxi pirata (pirate taxi).

In Argentina, illegal taxicabs are called remises truchos (false taxis).

In Colombia, illegal taxicabs are called piratas (pirates). These are usually private cars or former taxis that were decommissioned. 

In Norway and Denmark, an illegal cab is called pirattaxi (pirate taxi).

In Sweden, an illegal taxicab is called svarttaxi (black taxi), and is short for black market taxi.

In Trinidad and Tobago, illegal taxis are referred to as "PH" cars. This is because of the coding used on licence plates to distinguish private cars from taxis. On a private car's licence plate, the number begins with a "P" (for private), while on taxis the license plates begin with an "H" (for hired). Thus the slang "PH" indicates an informal blend of the two states.

In Algeria, they are referred to as le clandestin.

In Gabon they are called clandos.

In Jamaica, illegal taxis are referred to as robots or robot taxis.

In the Netherlands they are called snorders

In Turkey, an illegal taxicab is known as a "korsan taksi."

Types and exceptions
Unlicensed cabs may be found cruising the residential streets of a city, typically in the working-class neighborhoods.  Sometimes, drivers will also wait at a location where taxi service is in demand, such as airport or train station arrival areas or shopping centers, asking arriving passengers if they need a ride.  Unlicensed taxis often do not have meters, so the fare is usually agreed to at the beginning of the ride.  The car itself is usually large, similar in feel to a licensed taxi.

In New York City, Baltimore, Philadelphia, and other cities non-medallion car services (also called livery cabs) lawfully exist but are only supposed to respond to telephone dispatch.  They cannot legally pick up street hails or enter taxi stands at airports.  However, outside of the core Manhattan business district, livery cabs are ubiquitous and will respond to street hails. Some areas also have sedan services, which likewise respond to telephone dispatch.

There are also non-taxicab based unlicensed transportation providers.  Examples include "dollar vans" plying city bus routes in New York City, and van services that offer rides between major cities. In some places, providing a ride in a personal vehicle as a part of another job, such as caregiving, may be legal, sometimes with regulation of certain factors, such as insurance coverage.

Medallion systems
In some large American cities, and in Hong Kong, a medallion system is used to license cabs.  The city issues a fixed number of medallions, and only medallion taxis are allowed to pick up fares.  In general, this leads to medallions becoming ever more expensive—a New York City corporate medallion can sell for up to $1 million each. Medallions are transferable, and while some cab drivers own their own medallion, most must lease one on a daily or weekly basis from a fleet owner.

The medallion system has several effects upon the illegal transportation market.  By acting as a barrier to entry to the taxi market, it has the consequence of creating a market for unlicensed cabs, especially in areas that tend to be underserved by medallion cabs.  Taxi medallions tend to increase in value over time, and their owners and lessees tend to be very eager to protect their exclusive rights, for example, by lobbying for stricter enforcement against unlicensed cabs.

In working-class neighborhoods
In America, there is significant anecdotal evidence that unlicensed cabs are mostly found in working-class neighborhoods of large cities.

In Baltimore, United States, supermarkets in working-class neighborhoods frequently have "courtesy drivers" who, although not employed by the supermarket, have shown identification to management and are allowed to wait in front of the store for fares. Unlike licensed cab drivers, these courtesy drivers will also help to carry groceries up to one's apartment.  "Hacking" in Baltimore has grown grass-roots style to a region-wide phenomenon, originating from "Hack Clubs", organizations usually operating in converted rowhouses where "hacks" made their cars available, distributed business cards with a central number, employed a "dispatcher", and hung around the rowhouse waiting in line for calls.  This practice continues today, but hacking has evolved to the point where people nowadays just wag a finger toward the street, and wait for anyone to stop.  This new way of getting around remains popular, despite being potentially dangerous, due to disillusionment with the city transit service, and the fact that licensed cabs seldom stop for fares in the most dangerous parts of town.  There are plenty of willing drivers, and competition can be fierce.  The fare is negotiated and paid upfront.  Police maintain this is illegal, and sometimes enforce with $500 tickets, and a trip to the courthouse.

In Pittsburgh, jitneys are unlicensed cabs that specialize in areas underserved by traditional taxis and public transport, particularly the historically Black Hill District. This is the inspiration for August Wilson's play Jitney, which is set at a Hill District car service office.

Amish taxis
Unlicensed cabs are also found among the Amish of rural Pennsylvania. An Amish taxi is typically an illegal taxicab operation run on an informal basis by an individual who is not specifically running a taxi service, but who has been propositioned by an Amish person to transport them for shopping or business purposes. Old Order Amish do not drive, but will hire a van or taxi for trips for which they cannot use their traditional horse and buggy transportation.

In most rural locations with a low-density Amish population, it would be impractical for an Amish person to hire a commercial taxi from a metropolitan area since the taxi would have to drive long distances just to pick up the Amish person. It is therefore more convenient and less expensive to find an unlicensed non-Amish neighbor willing to act as a "taxi".

Normal individual automotive insurance is not intended to insure driving a vehicle for hire for business purposes. A paratransit license from the Pennsylvania Public Utility Commission (PUC) is required to operate an Amish taxi legally in Pennsylvania. This applies to anyone who transports people for a fee. The vehicle cannot hold more than 15 passengers, and must display a PUC identification number on both sides of the vehicle.

Crowdsourced taxis

Crowdsourced taxis are run by ridesharing companies. Since Uber's launch, several other companies have emulated its business model, a trend that has come to be referred to as "Uberification".

Many governments and taxi companies have protested against Uber, alleging that its use of unlicensed, crowd-sourced drivers was unsafe and illegal. Uber operates and functions as a taxi service company for the public by dispatching drivers to provide transportation services to passengers who pay Uber mileage-based fees and surcharges through credit card information kept on file by Uber. The taxi industry has pushed to have Uber treated the same as taxi companies, who face public safety requirements under the law ranging from how old vehicles on the road can be to how much they can charge or how many passengers allowed per vehicle and how much insurance they must carry.

See also
Taxicab regulation
Share taxi

References

Informal economy
Taxis
Black markets
Illegal occupations
Organized crime activity